Thanura Halambage (born 27 December 1993) is a Sri Lankan cricketer. He made his first-class debut for Chilaw Marians Cricket Club in the 2015–16 Premier League Tournament on 8 January 2016.

See also
 List of Chilaw Marians Cricket Club players

References

External links
 

1993 births
Living people
Sri Lankan cricketers
Chilaw Marians Cricket Club cricketers
Sportspeople from Galle